PBC Ural Great Perm was a Russian professional basketball club that was located in Perm, Russia. The club's home arena was Molot Sports Hall. The team played in the Russian Super League.

History
The club was established in the year 1995 on the basis of the local Technical University team. Ural Great won the Russian League championship on two occasions, in the years 2001 and 2002 and the Russian Cup in the year 2004. They also won the NEBL championship in the year 2001. Ural also won the EuroCup Challenge championship in the year 2006.

On October 14, 2008, court bailiffs seized Ural Great's office furniture and equipment for unpaid debts.  The team went bankrupt and did not participate in any further competitions.

Honours

Domestic competitions
 Russian League
 Winners (2): 2000–01, 2001–02
 Runners-up (2): 1999–00, 2002–03
 Russian Cup
 Winners (1): 2003–04

European competitions
 FIBA EuroCup Challenge
 Winners (1): 2005–06

Regional competitions
 North European Basketball League
 Winners (1): 2000–01

Other competitions
 FIBA International Christmas Tournament (defunct)
 Winners (1): 2001

Notable players

Head coaches
  Sergei Belov
  Valdemaras Chomičius

References

External links
Official site 

Sports clubs in Perm, Russia
Defunct basketball teams in Russia
Basketball teams established in 1995
Basketball teams disestablished in 2008
1995 establishments in Russia
2008 disestablishments in Russia